Meghan Maartens  is a South African water polo player, who is a member of the South Africa women's national water polo team. She was part of the team in the women's water polo tournament at the 2020 Summer Olympics.

She participated in the 2017 U-17 Women's Water Polo European Nations Cup.

References 

Living people
South African female water polo players
Water polo goalkeepers
Water polo players at the 2020 Summer Olympics
Olympic water polo players of South Africa
1999 births
20th-century South African women
21st-century South African women